Temperley is a district in Greater Buenos Aires, Argentina, located in the south of Lomas de Zamora Partido.

History 
In 1854 the industrial and textile merchant George Temperley (born in 1823 in Newcastle upon Tyne, England) bought from the Marenco brothers 51 hectares between the present streets of Dorrego, Almirante Brown, Eva Perón and Lavalle, and built a country house there. On October 16, 1870, Temperley set aside land from his extensive property for the establishment of a community, and participated in the building of both the original Lomas de Zamora City Hall and the Temperley railway station, one of the largest in Greater Buenos Aires.

In 1965 the town of Temperley was granted ciudad status by the Provincial Legislature.

Origin of the name 
It was George Temperley who helped to create Lomas de Zamora Partido and who made possible the foundation of the town of Temperley.

Important places 
Founded on November 1, 1912, Club Atlético Temperley is the football club for the Cities of Temperley and Turdera.

Gallery

External links
TemperleyWeb  
Temperley's Comercial Guide  
Club Atlético Temperley 

Populated places in Buenos Aires Province
Populated places established in 1870
Lomas de Zamora Partido
Cities in Argentina
1870 establishments in Argentina